The 2012 AFC Cup was the ninth edition of the AFC Cup, a football competition organized by the Asian Football Confederation (AFC) for clubs from "developing countries" in Asia.

Al-Kuwait from Kuwait won their second AFC Cup title in four years, defeating Erbil from Iraq with a 4–0 win in the final.

Allocation of entries per association
The following allocation of berths for the 2012 AFC Cup was approved by the AFC in November 2011. The four associations (Yemen, Malaysia, Maldives, Myanmar) with the lowest points according to the AFC evaluation system have one team entering the group stage and one team entering the play-off.

Notes
 Different from previous seasons where losers of the AFC Champions League qualifying play-off semi-final round also entered the AFC Cup, from 2012 only losers of the AFC Champions League qualifying play-off final round entered the AFC Cup.
 Kuwait have three teams entering as Al-Kuwait, the 2011 AFC Cup runners-up failed to fulfil the criteria set by AFC to compete in the 2012 AFC Champions League, and thus directly entered the 2012 AFC Cup.
 Bahrain, while eligible to enter the AFC Cup, chose not to participate in 2012.
 Indonesia only have one team entering as their league champion entered the 2012 AFC Champions League qualifying play-off.
 Malaysia returned to the competition, after not participating in 2011.
 Myanmar applied for upgrade from the AFC President's Cup to the AFC Cup, and was approved by the AFC in November 2011, and made their debut in the competition.
 After the withdrawal of Liaoning Whowin and disqualification of Persipura Jayapura from the 2012 AFC Champions League qualifying play-off East Asia Zone, only three teams were left, meaning only one final round loser would enter the AFC Cup in the East Asia Zone instead of two. As a result, no qualifying play-off was necessary for the East Asia Zone and both the second representatives from Malaysia (Terengganu) and Myanmar (Ayeyawady United), which were originally slated to enter the AFC Cup qualifying play-off, automatically advanced to the group stage. Persipura Jayapura were later provisionally reinstated to the 2012 AFC Champions League, but the AFC decided that the loser of the qualifying play-off match between Adelaide United and Persipura Jayapura would not advance to the 2012 AFC Cup group stage.

Qualified teams
A total of 33 teams participated in the 2012 AFC Cup, including 3 teams which joined as 2012 AFC Champions League qualifying play-off final round losers:
31 teams (19 in West Asia Zone, 12 in East Asia Zone) directly entered the group stage.
2 teams (both in West Asia Zone) competed in the qualifying play-off. The winners qualified for the group stage.

Notes
† Al-Oruba were the second representative from Oman, instead of Dhofar, the 2011 Sultan Qaboos Cup winners.

Schedule
Schedule of dates for 2012 competition.

Qualifying play-off

The draw for the qualifying play-off was held in Kuala Lumpur, Malaysia on 6 December 2011. The winner advanced to the group stage.

!colspan="3"|West Asia Zone

|}

Notes
Note 1: Due to the political crisis in Yemen, the AFC decided to switch the venue from Aden, Yemen to Malé, Maldives.

Group stage

The draw for the group stage was held in Kuala Lumpur, Malaysia on 6 December 2011. Clubs from the same country may not be drawn into the same group. The winners and runners-up of each group advanced to the knockout stage.

Group A

Group B

Group C

Group D

Group E

Group F

Group G

Group H

Knockout stage

Round of 16
The matchups for the round of 16 were decided based on the results from the group stage. Each tie was played as one match, hosted by the winners of each group (Team 1) against the runners-up of another group (Team 2).

|}

Quarter-finals
The draw for the quarter-finals, semi-finals, and final was held in Kuala Lumpur, Malaysia on 14 June 2012. It determined the matchups for the quarter-finals and semi-finals as well as the potential host for the final.

|}

Semi-finals

|}

Final

The final of the 2012 AFC Cup was hosted by one of the finalists, decided by a draw. According to the draw on 14 June 2012, the winner of semi-final 2 would host the final. Therefore, Erbil was the home team.

Top scorers

Note: Goals scored in qualifying play-off not counted.

Source:

See also
2012 AFC Champions League
2012 AFC President's Cup

References

External links
 

 
2
2012